Église Saint-Étienne may refer to a number of churches:

France 
 Église Saint-Étienne, Boofzheim
 Église Saint-Étienne, Lille
 Église Saint-Étienne, Mulhouse
 Église Saint-Étienne, Rosheim
 Église Saint-Étienne, Seltz
 Église Saint-Étienne, Strasbourg
 Église Saint-Étienne-du-Mont, Paris
 Temple Saint-Étienne, Mulhouse

Italy 
 Église Saint-Étienne, Aosta

See also 
 St. Stephen's Church (disambiguation) - Saint Étienne is the French name for Saint Stephen